Hollywood Canine Canteen is a 1946 Warner Bros. Merrie Melodies cartoon directed by Robert McKimson. The short was released on April 20, 1946.

The cartoon features various caricatures of Hollywood film celebrities and famous jazz musicians of the day, all zoomorphized as dogs.

Plot
The canine pets of Hollywood stars meet and decide they need their own nightclub. The cartoon tours the nightclub and presents a series of vignettes featuring dog-styled caricatures of Hollywood celebrities.

Notes
There are many dog-styled caricatures of Hollywood personalities in this cartoon.
Chairing the meeting is Edward G. Robinson
Speaking at the meeting is Jimmy Durante
Seated at the meeting are: Ed Wynn; Monty Woolley; ventriloquist Edgar Bergen and doll Charlie McCarthy; Laurel & Hardy
Welcoming the Sailor (voiced by Mel Blanc) and the Soldier to the Canteen: Bing Crosby (voiced by Paul Regan), also seen later; an unknown soldier and sailor, many either from the US Army, US Marines, US Navy) (The blonde woman who takes care of the soldiers uniform is Lauren Bacall)
On stage: Jerry Colonna (voiced by Blanc) and Bob Hope; Carmen Miranda, dancing with her signature fruit headdress; Babbit and Catstello (caricatures of Abbott and Costello, from other cartoons such as The Mouse-Merized Cat; only here, they are dogs; Catstello is also voiced by Blanc)
At the snack bar: Arthur Lake (as Dagwood, here called "Dogwood" and voiced by Paul Corley); Penny Singleton (as Blondie Bumstead and voiced by Sara Berner)
Laurel and Hardy again, washing dishes
In the lounge with the wall portraits: an unknown woman in a red dress (possibly Joan Leslie) with a red bow in her hair; an unknown long-haired man stumbling
At the phone desk: an unknown soldier (a southern US soldier Jackie Kelk (who played Henry Aldrich in The Aldrich Family) due to his southern accent with a quirky voice), wanting to place a call; an unknown woman seated at a desk with a New Jersey accent (sounded like Paulette Goddard)
The conductor is Leopold Stokowski, parodied in other WB cartoons such as Hollywood Steps Out and Rhapsody Rabbit; the musicians are likely anonymous, except for the tuba player, Joe Besser (voiced by Blanc; Besser later co-starred in the Three Stooges)
Bing Crosby (voiced by Richard Bickenbach instead of Regan) crooning while stuffing a pipe; Frank Sinatra (voiced by Robert Lyons); Dorothy Lamour
Bandleader Kay Kyser (as Kaynine Kyser); poet and cornet player Merwyn Bogue (aka Ish Kabibble) as "Ish Kapoodle"
Dancing soldier and woman (possibly Rita Hayworth)
Woman in a blue dress (looks like Kate Smith) consoling weeping soldier
Dancing woman who wants to "cut a rug" (possibly Katharine Hepburn)
Trumpeter Harry James (as "Hairy James"); trombonist Tommy Dorsey as "Tommy Dorgy"; xylophonist Lionel Hampton as "Lionel Hambone and his Bonophone"; clarinetist Benny Goodman as "Boney Goodman"; Jimmy Durante again, playing the piano as "Schnauser Durante" (a play on Durante's nickname, "The Schnoz")

Home media
Hollywood Canine Canteen is available, uncensored and uncut, on Looney Tunes Golden Collection: Volume 6, Disc 2.
It is also available on The Golden Age of Looney Tunes Volume 2 laserdisc.

References

External links

1946 films
1946 animated films
1946 short films
Merrie Melodies short films
Warner Bros. Cartoons animated short films
Hollywood, Los Angeles in fiction
Animated films about dogs
Animation based on real people
Cultural depictions of Edward G. Robinson
Cultural depictions of Bing Crosby
Cultural depictions of Laurel & Hardy
Cultural depictions of Abbott and Costello
Cultural depictions of Frank Sinatra
Films directed by Robert McKimson
1940s Warner Bros. animated short films
Films about Hollywood, Los Angeles
Films about pets
Films set in nightclubs